Ghost Wanted is a 1940 Warner Bros. Merrie Melodies animated short directed by Chuck Jones. The short was released on August 10, 1940.

It features a little ghost (bearing a resemblance to Casper the Friendly Ghost) who is inexperienced at haunting houses and whose "suit/sheets" resemble the typical footy pajamas with the "trap door" that were popular in the era. The little ghost is silent, goes to a haunting job interview and is terrorized by a bigger ghost.

Plot
The short starts out in the little ghost's house as he is reading a book titled How To Haunt Houses showing various recommended haunting positions that are usually successful for ghosts. He tries out a few of the positions by posing and then reads the Haunt Ads in the Saturday Evening Ghost (dated Saturday December 13, 1939 - date that was actually a Wednesday).

He comes across a haunting job that does not require experience at the address of 1313 Dracula Drive that he likes. He changes from his white "suit/sheets" into a new light blue colored "suit" (he also puts on a white hat)  and is invisible for the interim between changing "suits". Even though he can pass through closed doors like an ordinary ghost, he prefers opening them while passing through.

He arrives at the house at 1313 Dracula Drive, which is on a mountain, and tries out for the house-haunting job, but ends up getting terrorized by a bigger ghost interviewing him for the position.

The ghost terrorizes him by yelling Boo!", sending him a Ghostal Telegraph that says "Boo!", and dropping a lit firecracker that resembles an M-80 that the little ghost just barely runs away from.

The bigger ghost's plans backfire on him when the fuses of the fireworks he put in his "back pocket" get lit by the lit match he dropped. He is sent flying throughout the house after the little ghost and ultimately into a well somewhere outside the building. The little ghost flees to his own house.

Other appearances
The animated short was shown on TBS from 1987 to 1992 as a segment of the Tom & Jerry Halloween Special.

The young ghost has also made appearances as an enemy in numerous video games. His appearances include The Bugs Bunny Crazy Castle series for NES and Game Boy as well as the NES game Bugs Bunny's Birthday Blowout.

Releases
This film is included on The Golden Age of Looney Tunes (Vol. 4) LaserDisc release.

References

1940 films
1940 animated films
Merrie Melodies short films
Films scored by Carl Stalling
Short films directed by Chuck Jones
1940s American films